Cornell M. Green (born February 10, 1940), is a former American football player,  a defensive back for thirteen seasons in the National Football League (NFL) with the  Dallas Cowboys. He did not play college football at Utah State University, but was a two-time All-American basketball player for the Aggies, selected in 1962 NBA draft, but not in the NFL draft.

Early years
Born in Oklahoma City, Oklahoma, Green was raised in northern California in Richmond and attended El Cerrito High School.

He played college basketball at Utah State University in Logan, where he earned All-American honors (1961, 1962) as well as All-Skyline conference honors in each of his three years (1960–62). As a  forward, Green set the Aggie career rebounding record with 1,067 which still stands today. He is also the fifth leading scorer in Utah State history with 1,890 points.

Green produced some of the best individual seasons in school history as his 745 points in 1962 are still in second place, while his 403 rebounds in 1960 remain a school record for a season. He was the Skyline conference MVP as a sophomore.

In his three seasons with the Aggies, Utah State went to the National Invitation Tournament in 1960 and to the NCAA Tournament in 1962. The 1960 team finished eighth in the Associated Press Poll and seventh in the Coaches' Poll, which remains the highest year-end basketball ranking in school history.

In 1993, Green was inducted into the inaugural class of the Utah State University Intercollegiate Athletics Hall Of Fame. In 2001, he was inducted into the State of Utah Basketball Hall of Fame.

Professional career
Green was a college basketball player who never played a down of college football, that the Dallas Cowboys converted into a defensive back.

On a tip from Utah State basketball coach LaDell Anderson, the Cowboys discovered and signed the multi-talented younger brother of then Red Sox infielder Pumpsie Green for $1,000 dollars. This was one of the innovative personnel decisions the Cowboys were renowned for.

At that time, he was leaning towards playing in the NBA, after being selected by the Chicago Zephyrs in the fifth round of the 1962 NBA Draft. Even when he reported to the Cowboys' training camp in Marquette, Michigan, in 1962, he just thought of it as a $1,000 bonus. "I figured I’d go there for a week ... and they’d cut me," Green has said.

His teammates nicknamed him "Sweet Lips" and eventually made the 1962 team as an undrafted free agent, learning fast enough to start 3 games and be selected to the NFL All-Rookie team. The next season, he became a full-time starter at left cornerback setting a career best with 7 interceptions.

Green became a big-time contributor to Tom Landry’s intricate defensive schemes and a feared defender during his career. All he was missing were the interception stats. Said Gil Brandt: "I mean, if Cornell had any kind of hands, he would’ve had three times as many interceptions as he got ... and the guy played basketball in college."

He played cornerback during his first eight seasons, while leading the team in interceptions 4 times, being named to 5 Pro Bowls and 4 All-Pro teams. Cowboys coach Tom Landry said of Green, "He had the athletic skills from basketball to become a fine defensive back.  His only transition was playing a sport where you could tackle someone with the ball, and Cornell never had a problem dealing with that".

Safety Mike Gaechter suffered a career-ending Achilles tendon injury in the last Playoff Bowl in January 1970, and with the cornerback position needing an upgrade, Tom Landry moved Mel Renfro to play cornerback. Given that Renfro was an All-Pro in 1969 at safety, the move may have seemed to be an odd one, but Renfro was matched with Herb Adderley, and the duo was better than Green and Phil Clark. Green in turn, moved from cornerback to the strong safety position, while the free safety position was handled between third-round pick Charlie Waters and undrafted free agent Cliff Harris.

After the switch, the Cowboys went to two consecutive Super Bowls. In 1971 and 1972 he went back to the Pro Bowl at safety.

Green never missed a game in 13 seasons, he played 168 games, including 145 consecutive starts for the Cowboys (1962–1974). He made five Pro Bowls at two different positions — cornerback and strong safety. He is sixth in career interceptions (34) in Cowboys history. He retired as a player in September 1975, and went from part-time to full-time scout for the Cowboys.

In 1985, he was named to the Dallas Cowboys 25th Anniversary Team.

In 2017, the Professional Football Researchers Association named Green to the PFRA Hall of Very Good Class of 2017

After football
Green began scouting for the Dallas Cowboys in 1970 while still an active player and continued scouting through 1979, at which time he entered private business until joining the Denver Broncos in 1987. He spent 35 years scouting in the NFL, and 28 seasons doing it with the Broncos. In 2010, he received the AFC Scout of the Year Award from the Fritz Pollard Alliance.

Personal
He is the brother of Pumpsie Green, the first African American player to play for the Boston Red Sox, the last Major League Baseball team to integrate.

References

External links
 

1940 births
Living people
Sportspeople from Oklahoma City
Players of American football from Oklahoma
African-American players of American football
African-American basketball players
All-American college men's basketball players
American football cornerbacks
American football safeties
Chicago Zephyrs draft picks
Dallas Cowboys players
Dallas Cowboys scouts
Utah State Aggies men's basketball players
Eastern Conference Pro Bowl players
National Conference Pro Bowl players
American men's basketball players
Forwards (basketball)
21st-century African-American people
20th-century African-American sportspeople